Sweet Love, Bitter is a soundtrack album by American jazz pianist Mal Waldron recorded in 1967 for the film of the same name written by Lewis Jacobs and directed by Herbert Danska and released on the Impulse! label. The movie was a loose fictitious retelling of Charlie Parker's last years and a portrait of the jazz scene in 1960s New York.

Reception
The Allmusic review by Ken Dryden awarded the album 4 stars stating "the music by Waldron is brilliant. Known for his lyrical yet often dark compositions, Waldron's work on this session will surprise some of his biggest fans".

Track listing
All compositions by Mal Waldron
 "Loser's Lament (Theme From "Sweet Love, Bitter")" — 5:11  
 "Della" — 2:36  
 "Hillary" — 2:23  
 "Espresso Time" — 2:11  
 "Keel" — 2:40  
 "Smokin'" — 2:06  
 "Della's Dream" — 2:23  
 "The Search" — 1:21  
 "Candy's Ride" — 1:18  
 ""Bread"" — 1:47  
 "Eagle Flips Out" — 2:14  
 "Brindle's Place" — 3:07  
 "Sleep Baby Sleep — 2:11 
Recorded in New York City on March 23, 1967.

Personnel
 Mal Waldron — piano
 Dave Burns — trumpet
George Coleman — tenor saxophone, alto saxophone
Charles Davis — baritone saxophone 
 Richard Davis (tracks 1 & 4) George Duvivier (tracks 2, 3 & 5–13) — bass
 Al Dreares — drums

References

Impulse! Records soundtracks
Mal Waldron albums
1967 soundtrack albums
Drama film soundtracks
Jazz soundtracks